Neelam Kler is an Indian neonatologist, known for her pioneering work on neonatal intensive care and ventilation. She is credited with developing neonatal care to better the survival rate of extremely tiny preterm babies (less than 1000 grams) to 90 per cent. The Government of India honoured her with the third-highest civilian award, Padmabhushan, in 2014, for her services to the fields of medicine and neonatology.

Biography
Neelam Kler was born in Srinagar, in the state of Jammu and Kashmir in India, and had her schooling in the Presentation Convent School in Srinagar. Opting for the medical profession, she obtained a master's degree in Paediatrics from the Postgraduate Institute of Medical Sciences and Research, (PIGMER) Chandigarh and continued there for further training in neonatology. Later, she went to Copenhagen, Denmark, on a fellowship in neonatology from the Copenhagen University for advanced studies on the subject.

Professional career
After returning from Copenhagen, Kler started her professional career in India by joining Sir Ganga Ram Hospital, New Delhi, on 31 May 1988. During a career spanning 26 years, Kler launched the department of neonatology at the hospital, presently holding the position of the Chairperson.

She has also worked as a visiting consultant at King Fahd University Hospital, Gizan, Saudi Arabia, and as a fellow in neonatology at the Milwaukee Children Hospital, Wisconsin, USA.

Presently she holds the following offices:
 President of the National Neonatology Forum.
 Advisor on CNAG (Cell of Nutrition Advisory Group) on line service on Nutrition queries.
 Editor -'Journal of Neonatology a quarterly journal published by National Neonatology Forum.
 Organising Chairperson of FAOPS (Federation of Asia and Oceania Perinatal Societies) 2010
 Member – WHO Expert Committee on prevention of birth defects in South East Asia.
 Master trainer, American Academy of Pediatrics – Baby's Breath assistance.
 Member – Global Neonatal Nutrition Consensus Group for the development of international guidelines on feeding the preterm infants

She has, at various points, collaborated with United Nations International Children's Emergency Fund, and World Health Organization, on various matters related to neonatological care. She is also a panel member of the Newborn and child health strategy of the Ministry of Health and Family Welfare.

On the social front, Dr. Kler chairs the Health Care at ALL Ladies League.

Legacy

Neelam Kler is known for the development of neonatal care, especially the care of preterm babies, and is considered a pioneer in intensive care and ventilation. She is credited with developing the department of neonatology at Sir Ganga Ram Hospital, New Delhi to a state of the art facility with modern high frequency ventilation with Nitric Oxide delivery and bedside cerebral function monitoring. Statistical data has shown that, under Dr. Kler, the survival rate of preterm babies, weighing less than 1000 grams, have improved to 90 per cent and the infection rate was brought down to 9.8 per 1000 inpatients.

She has also contributed in initiating a three-year doctoral program in neonatology by the National Board of Examinations.

Awards and recognitions
 Padmabhushan – 2014 – the sole recipient for medicine category to be awarded in 2014.

Publications
Neelam Kler has published several articles in national and international books on paediatrics, some of them are:
 Meconium Aspiration Syndrome (MAS), in collaboration with Pankaj Garg, in Recent Advances in Paediatrics
 Auditory Neuropathy Spectrum Disorder in Late Preterm and Term  infants with Severe Jaundice with Satish Saluja, Asha Agarwal and Sanjiv Amin
 Chapter 011 Follow-up of Preterm Baby with Anita Singh
 Chapter-004 Parenteral Nutrition in Neonatal Intensive Care Unit with Choudhury Vivek and Navin Gupta
 Chapter-62 Neonatal Transport with Sony Arun and Navin Gupta
 Chapter-005 Parenteral Nutrition in Newborn with Sony Arun
 Chapter-64 Neonatal Respiratory Disorders with Sony Arun and Satish Saluja
 Selected Macro/Micronutrient Needs of the Routine Preterm Infant with Jatinder Bhatia, Ian Griffin, Diane Anderson, and Magnus Domelleof

See also

 Pediatrics
 Preterm birth
 American Academy of Pediatrics
 King Fahd University Hospital
 Sir Ganga Ram Hospital (India)

References

External links

Living people
Recipients of the Padma Bhushan in medicine
People from Srinagar
Indian neonatologists
Family and parenting writers
Child care
Medical doctors from Jammu and Kashmir
Indian women medical doctors
20th-century Indian women scientists
20th-century Indian medical doctors
Year of birth missing (living people)
20th-century women physicians